Tiffany may refer to:

People
 Tiffany (given name), list of people with this name
 Tiffany (surname), list of people with this surname
Known mononymously as "Tiffany":
 Tiffany Darwish, (born 1971), an American singer, songwriter, actress known by her mononym Tiffany
 Tiffany Young, (born 1989), an American singer, member of girl group Girls' Generation (and later its subgroup TTS)
 Tiffany (American wrestler) (born 1985), better known by her birth name Taryn Terrell
 Tiffany (Mexican wrestler) (born 1973), Mexican professional wrestler

Businesses
 Tiffany & Co., a jewelry and specialty retailer founded by Charles Lewis Tiffany
 Tiffany jewelry, a style of jewelry created by Louis Comfort Tiffany at Tiffany & Co.
 Tiffany setting, a prong setting for diamonds
 Louis Comfort Tiffany or Tiffany Studios, or Tiffany Glass and Decorating Company
 Tiffany glass
 Tiffany lamp
 Tiffany Pictures, a movie studio
 Tiffany (automobile), an electric car manufactured 1913–1914

Places

United States
 Tiffany, Colorado, an unincorporated community
 Tiffany, Wisconsin, a town
 Tiffany, Rock County, Wisconsin, an unincorporated community

Animals
 Tiffany or Tiffanie, a breed of domestic cat also known as the Asian Semi-longhair
 Chantilly-Tiffany, a breed of domestic cat also known as the Foreign Longhair

Entertainment
 Tiffany (Child's Play), a murderous doll in the Child's Play series of horror films
 Tiffany (album), the debut album of Tiffany Darwish, released on 15 September 1987
 Tiffany (Image Comics), a fictional character in Todd McFarlane's Spawn comic book series
 Tiffany Club, a defunct jazz club in Los Angeles

Military awards
 Tiffany Cross Medal of Honor, World War I era US Navy and US Marine Corps Medal of Honor

Other uses 

 Tiffany (silk), a light, thin, and transparent silk material, similar to a gauze
 List of storms named Tiffany, three tropical cyclones in the Australian region of the Southern Hemisphere

See also
 Tiffanie (given name)
 Breakfast at Tiffany's (disambiguation)